Eleven Hopes  is a 1975 Soviet sports comedy film directed by Viktor Sadovsky.

Plot 
The film tells about the creation of a football team and her preparation for the World Cup.

Cast 
 Anatoly Papanov as Vorontsov
 Lyubov Virolaynen as Lozovskaya
 Yuriy Demich as Romantsev
 Aleksandr Goloborodko as Lavrenyov
 Igor Dobryakov as Sokolovsky
 Nikolai Sektimenko as Parkhomenko
 Boris Shcherbakov as Babochkin
 Yevgeny Leonov-Gladyshev as Kosichkin
 Nikolai Ozerov as Commentator
 Igor Gorbachyov as Nikolai Ivanovich

References

External links 
 

1975 films
1970s Russian-language films
Soviet sports comedy films
Lenfilm films
Soviet association football films